Bob Lanier (1948–2022) was an American basketball player and coach.

Bob Lanier may also refer to:

Bob Lanier (politician) (1925–2014), American politician
Bob Lanier Middle School, Houston, Texas

See also

Rob Lanier (born 1968), American basketball coach